Gheorghiță Ștefan (also known as Ștefan Gheorghiță, born January 17, 1986, in Bucharest) is a male freestyle wrestler from Romania. He participated in men's freestyle 74 kg at 2008 Summer Olympics. He lost the bronze medal fight against Murad Gaidarov. However, after a positive doping test Soslan Tigiev of Uzbekistan was in November 2016 stripped of the silver medal. Ștefan Gheorghiță was therefore moved up to a bronze medal position.

In 2016, he married Romanian judoka Corina Căprioriu.

References

External links
 
 
 
 
 
 STEFAN Gheorghita (family name: STEFAN, given name: Gheorghita) at Universiade 2013

1986 births
Living people
Romanian male sport wrestlers
Olympic wrestlers of Romania
Olympic bronze medalists for Romania
Olympic medalists in wrestling
Wrestlers at the 2008 Summer Olympics
Medalists at the 2008 Summer Olympics
European Games competitors for Romania
Wrestlers at the 2015 European Games
Universiade medalists in wrestling
Universiade gold medalists for Romania
European Wrestling Championships medalists
Medalists at the 2013 Summer Universiade